Sauermann is a German language habitational surname. Notable people with the name include:

 Erich Sauermann (1919–1984), German water polo player
 Lisa Sauermann (1992), German mathematician
 Sakkie Sauermann (1944–2014), South African rugby union player

References 

German-language surnames
German toponymic surnames